The Timid Terror is a 1926 American comedy film directed by Del Andrews and written by Gerald Duffy. The film stars George O'Hara, Edith Murgatroyd, Doris Hill, Rex Lease, George Nichols and Dot Farley. The film was released on November 7, 1926, by Film Booking Offices of America.

Cast          
George O'Hara as Talbot Trent
Edith Murgatroyd as Mrs. Trent 
Doris Hill as Dorothy Marvin
Rex Lease as Howard Cramm
George Nichols as Amos Milliken
Dot Farley as Mrs. Milliken

References

External links
 

1926 films
Silent American comedy films
Film Booking Offices of America films
Films directed by Del Andrews
American silent feature films
American black-and-white films
1926 comedy films
1920s American films